Ireneusz Tadeusz Mulak (born 30 March 1956) is a Polish former basketball player. He competed in the men's tournament at the 1980 Summer Olympics.

References

External links
 
 
 

1956 births
Living people
Polish men's basketball players
Olympic basketball players of Poland
Basketball players at the 1980 Summer Olympics
Sportspeople from Lublin
Lech Poznań (basketball) players